Savoy is a village in Champaign County, Illinois, United States. The population was 8,857 at the 2020 census.

History
The village was named after Princess Maria Clotilde of Savoy, who had paid the area a visit in 1861. Henry M. Dunlap (1853-1938), Illinois farmer and state legislator, lived in Savoy.

Geography
Savoy is located at  (40.063441, −88.252388).

Savoy shares a border with the neighboring city of Champaign and is less than two miles from the site of the main campus of the University of Illinois. Savoy is a part of the Champaign–Urbana metropolitan area.

Transportation 
The northern part of Savoy and a corridor along Dunlap Avenue are serviced by the Champaign-Urbana Mass Transit District.

U.S. Route 45 (Dunlap Avenue) runs north through Savoy into Champaign, Illinois becoming Neil Street. Savoy is about 2–3 miles east of, but in relative proximity to Interstate 57 with access via Curtis Road at Exit 232 and Monticello Road at Exit 229.

The University of Illinois Willard Airport (KCMI) that serves East Central Illinois, with commercial airline service to Chicago O'Hare Airport and Dallas/Fort Worth provided by American Eagle, is located immediately south of Savoy.

Demographics

As of the 2020 census there were 8,857 people, 3,548 households, and 1,848 families residing in the village. The racial makeup of the village was 66.14% White, 6.93% African American, 0.14% Native American, 18.40% Asian, 0.01% Pacific Islander, 1.55% from other races, and 6.83% from two or more races. Hispanic or Latino of any race were 4.28% of the population.

There were 3,548 households, out of which 48.37% had children under the age of 18 living with them, 42.62% were married couples living together, 6.00% had a female householder with no husband present, and 47.91% were non-families. 33.74% of all households were made up of individuals, and 17.08% had someone living alone who was 65 years of age or older. The average household size was 3.22 and the average family size was 2.45.

The village's age distribution consisted of 20.2% under the age of 18, 14.6% from 18 to 24, 26.9% from 25 to 44, 18.1% from 45 to 64, and 20.1% who were 65 years of age or older. The median age was 36.1 years. For every 100 females, there were 78.3 males. For every 100 females age 18 and over, there were 81.0 males.

The median income for a household in the village was $74,189, and the median income for a family was $110,655. Males had a median income of $58,594 versus $32,234 for females. The per capita income for the village was $39,751. About 7.3% of families and 12.8% of the population were below the poverty line, including 10.0% of those under age 18 and 8.6% of those age 65 or over.

References

External links

Official website
Official website of the Village of Savoy Fire Department

Villages in Champaign County, Illinois
Villages in Illinois